Marion Union Station is a former passenger railroad station at 532 W. Center Street in Marion, Ohio, United States. As a union station it served several train lines: the Chesapeake and Ohio Railway, Cleveland, Cincinnati, Chicago and St. Louis Railway or CCC & St. L. (acquired in 1906 by the New York Central Railroad), and Erie Railroad (and its successor Erie Lackawanna Railroad). These lines intersected at the station, so it was a significant transfer point between different geographic points.

History 
It was built in 1902 (opening on July 31), it featured marble walls and patterned mosaic tiles on the floor. In 1923, it was the last stop on president Warren Harding's funeral train. It was a canteen stop for soldiers during World War II. It had its last long distance train in 1971 with the end of the Chesapeake & Ohio's connector line to the George Washington.

Into the 1960s, it was a stop for several long distance passenger trains on the following railroads:

Chesapeake and Ohio
Sportsman (Detroit, MI – Newport News and Washington, D.C., via Toledo, Columbus and Charlottesville); in last years a connector line for the George Washington
Erie Railroad (and after 1960: Erie Lackawanna)
Atlantic Express and Pacific Express (Chicago, IL – Hoboken, NJ)
Erie Limited (Chicago, IL – Hoboken, NJ)
Lake Cities (Chicago, IL – Hoboken, NJ)
New York Central
Cleveland Special / Gateway (St. Louis, MO – Cleveland, OH)
Southwestern Limited (St. Louis, MO – New York, NY)

Disposition today
Presently the station is the site of a museum run by the Marion Union Station Association.

About 60 CSX and Norfolk Southern freight trains pass by each day.

References

Stations along Chesapeake and Ohio Railway lines
Former Erie Railroad stations
Former New York Central Railroad stations
Railway stations in the United States opened in 1902
Railway stations closed in 1971
Marion, Ohio